The 1874 Glasgow and Aberdeen Universities by-election was fought on 14 March 1874.  The byelection was fought due to the incumbent Conservative MP, Edward Strathearn Gordon, becoming Lord Advocate.  It was retained by the incumbent who was unopposed.

References

1874 in Scotland
1870s elections in Scotland
1874 elections in the United Kingdom
By-elections to the Parliament of the United Kingdom in Glasgow and Aberdeen Universities
19th century in Aberdeen
1870s in Glasgow
Unopposed by-elections to the Parliament of the United Kingdom in Scottish constituencies